Dillsburg is an unincorporated community in Champaign County, Illinois, United States. Dillsburg is located near U.S. Route 136, east of Rantoul.

References

Unincorporated communities in Champaign County, Illinois
Unincorporated communities in Illinois